The Weengushk International Film Festival is an annual film festival on Manitoulin Island in the Canadian province of Ontario. Organized by Shirley Cheechoo's Weengushk Film Institute in partnership with Brock University and staged for the first time in 2018, the festival presents a program of local, national and international indigenous-themed films, primarily but not exclusively in M'Chigeeng.

Due to the COVID-19 pandemic in Canada, the 2020 festival was staged online. The 2020 festival included the films Red Snow, The Body Remembers When the World Broke Open, Happy Face, There Are No Fakes and One Day in the Life of Noah Piugattuk, as well as a retrospective program of Cheechoo's own films and live musical performances by Crystal Shawanda, Nick Sherman, Adrian Sutherland and Leland Bell. Actor Gary Farmer and actress and producer Jennifer Podemski presented workshops on acting and production, and journalist and arts administrator Jesse Wente gave the keynote speech.

References

External links

Film festivals in Ontario
Film festivals established in 2018
Indigenous film festivals in Canada
Manitoulin Island